
Notable grunge bands include:

United States

Seattle area

Elsewhere in United States 
 Hole (Los Angeles, California)
 L7 (Los Angeles, California)
 Paw  (Lawrence, Kansas)
 The Smashing Pumpkins (Chicago, Illinois) 
 Stone Temple Pilots (San Diego, California)
 Wool (Washington, D.C.; based out of Los Angeles, California)
 Dandelion (Philadelphia, Pennsylvania)

Australia

Canada

Germany

United Kingdom 
 Bush
 Radiohead (early work)
 Battalion of Flies

France

Poland

See also 
 List of post-grunge bands

References 

Grunge musical groups
Grunge